Sekolah Menengah Kebangsaan Undang Jelebu known also as SMK Undang Jelebu, is a secondary school located in Jelebu District, Negeri Sembilan, Malaysia. In 2009, Sekolah Menengah Kebangsaan Undang Jelebu had 840 pupils: 449 boys and 391 girls, and employed 61 teachers.

Educational institutions established in 1983
Jelebu District
Secondary schools in Malaysia